Simone Bagel-Trah (born 1969) is a German businesswoman and Chairman of the Supervisory Board and Chairman of the Shareholders' Committee of Henkel.

Early life and education
Bagel-Trah's mother is Anja Bohlan, an economist and academic who published several books. Her father is  Fritz Bagel. Bagel-Trah is a great-great-granddaughter of the Henkel founder Fritz Henkel.

She graduated from the Max Planck Gymnasium in Düsseldorf in 1988. From 1988 to 1993 she studied biology at the University of Bonn. In 1998, she received her doctorate.

Career
From 1998 to 2000 Bagel-Trah worked as an independent consultant for project management in the field of microbiology and pharmacy. In 2000, she became Managing Partner of Antiinfectives Intelligence GmbH in Rheinbach. She is a founding member of the since 6 December 2007 existing University Council of Heinrich Heine University of Düsseldorf.

Since 30 April 2001, Bagel-Trah has been a member of the Supervisory Board of Henkel AG & Co. KGaA. As of 14 April 2008, she was the deputy chairman. On 22 September 2009, she took over the chairmanship, making her the first woman on this position in a DAX-listed company. At the same time she also became Chairman of the Shareholders' Committee, whose members include non-family managers also five Henkel heirs and which combines the interests of the three Henkel family members. Since 28 April 2014 she is member of the Supervisory Board of Bayer AG.

Awards 
Bagel-Trah was named as one of the "75 most influential women in German Business" by Manager Magazin and Boston Consulting Group (BCG) in 2017.

In 2020, she was honored by the strategy consulting firm Boston Consulting Group (BCG) and the business magazine Manager Magazin as the most influential woman in German business of 2019 and named "Prima inter Pares 2019".

Other activities

Corporate boards
 Bayer AG, Member of the Supervisory Board (since 2014)
 Heraeus, Member of the Supervisory Board (since 2011)
 Commerzbank, Member of the Central Advisory Board
 HSBC Trinkaus & Burkhardt, Member of the Advisory Board

Non-profit organizations
 Max Planck Society, Member of the Senate
 University of Düsseldorf (HHU), Member of the Board of Trustees
 Düsseldorf Business School, Member of the Board of Trustees
 Stifterverband für die Deutsche Wissenschaft, Vice Chairwoman of the Board
 Fritz Henkel Foundation, Chairwoman of the Board of Directors
 Foundation for Family Businesses, Member of the Board of Trustees
 Rotary International, Member

Personal life 
Simone Bagel-Trah ist married to Christoph Trah (* 1966). Together they have two children.

References

1969 births
Living people
German chief executives
21st-century German businesswomen
21st-century German businesspeople
Businesspeople from Düsseldorf
People in the chemical industry
Henkel